Alireza Taghaboni (Persian: علیرضا تغابنی), (born 1977) is an Iranian architect based in Tehran, Iran. He has designed contemporary buildings in Tehran such as the Sharifi-ha House and Cedrus Residential. He is on the faculty at the Center for Contemporary Architecture in Tehran.

Background 
Taghaboni was born in Tehran in 1977. In 1995 he studied architecture in Guilan, Iran at University of Guilan. In 2002 he earned a master's degree in architecture. He is known for his inventive and experimental architecture. He earned a Ph.D. in architecture from Tehran's Azad University and he works at the Center for Contemporary Architecture in Tehran on the faculty.

Career 
He began his architecture in 2004 and he opened an architecture firm (Next Office) in 2009. He created the contemporary Sharifi-ha House with a moving facade in 2013. He also created the Cedrus Residential with its contemporary multi-layer facade and staggered balconies. He has designed 60 projects.

In an interview with the Financial Times he said that he was inspired by postwar Japan.

Awards 
 2018 Royal Academy Dorfman Award 
 2018 World Architecture Festival award (WAF) for the Guyim Vault House

Personal life 
He is married to architect Zahra Jahani.

References

External links 
Video of interview with Alireza Taghaboni

1977 births
Iranian architects
21st-century architects
People from Tehran
Living people